Renascent Misanthropy Is the debut album for Australian Black Metal band Astriaal.

Background
Renascent Misanthropy contained a mix of new unreleased recordings, and some new recordings of songs previously found on various demo's and EP's. Lachlan Mitchell of Nazxul fame was hired as a producer and engineer for the album, as well as providing synthesizers for some of the album's tracks. Originally released in jewel case by Gryphon's Blacktalon Media Label, with various re-releases by Aftermath Music and Obsidian records. The latter included a CD-ROM featuring a live video of Arborescence and a photo gallery.

A vinyl pressing was released in June 2012 by Art of Propaganda and limited to 300 copies.

Track listing

 Note: The Funeral Procession Performed by Tharen  .
 Note: The Halls of Perdition Performed by Arzarkhel  .

Personnel
 Arzarkhel – All vocals and lyrics
 Gryphon -Drums and percussion
 Baaruhl - lead, Rhythm and Acoustic guitars
 Murtach – bass guitar

Addition personnel

 Helthor - Co arrangement and Composition
 Lachlan Mitchell- Synthesizers

References

Astriaal albums
2003 albums